Giovanni "Ernesto" Ceirano (1889-1956) was an Italian industrialist, son of Giovanni Ceirano, co-founder of Fabbrica Automobili Ceirano, co-owner of Aurea (Fabrica Anonima Torinese Automobili -F.A.T.A.) and two-time winner of the Targa Florio.

Ceirano family background

The Ceirano brothers, Giovanni Battista, Giovanni, Ernesto and Matteo, were influential in the founding of the Italian auto industry, being variously responsible for : Ceirano; Welleyes (the technical basis of F.I.A.T.); Fratelli Ceirano; S.T.A.R. / Rapid (Società Torinese Automobili Rapid); SCAT (Società Ceirano Automobili Torino); Itala and S.P.A. (Società Piemontese Automobili). Giovanni's son Giovanni "Ernesto" was also influential, co-founding Ceirano Fabbrica Automobili (aka Giovanni Ceirano Fabbrica Automobili) and  Fabrica Anonima Torinese Automobili (FATA).

In 1888, after eight years apprenticeship at his father's watch-making business, Giovanni Battista started building Welleyes bicycles, so named because English names had more sales appeal. In October 1898 Giovanni Battista and Matteo co-founded Ceirano GB & C and started producing the Welleyes motor car in 1899. In July 1899 the plant and patents were sold to Giovanni Agnelli and produced as the first F.I.A.T.s - the Fiat 4 HP. Giovanni Battista was employed by Fiat as the agent for Italy, but within a year he left to found Fratelli Ceirano & C. which in 1903 became Società Torinese Automobili Rapid (S.T.A.R.) building cars badged as 'Rapid'. In 1904 Matteo Ceirano left Ceirano GB & C to create his own brand - Itala. In 1906 Matteo left Itala to found S.P.A. (Società Piemontese Automobili) with chief designer, Alberto Ballacco. In 1906 Giovanni founded SCAT (Società Ceirano Automobili Torino) in Turin. In 1919 Giovanni and Giovanni "Ernesto" co-founded Ceirano Fabbrica Automobili (aka Giovanni Ceirano Fabbrica Automobili) and in 1922 they took control of  Fabrica Anonima Torinese Automobili (FATA).

Career

Racing

In 1914 he drove his father Giovanni's SCAT 25/35 (4,398 cc) to his second victory in the Targa Florio, completing a single 979 km lap of the island in 16 hours 51 minutes 31 seconds at an average speed of 58.07 km/h.

Industry
In 1919 he co-founded the Fabbrica Automobili Ceirano with his father Giovanni.

In 1934 he acquired the car company FATA (Fabrica Anonima Torinese Automobili) again with his father Giovanni. Fiat had imposed legal restrictions on Giovanni during the sale of SCAT-Ceirano, preventing him from being an automotive manufacturer, so the FATA business was reorientated to make auto parts. It ceased activity in 1945.

Death
Giovanni Ceirano died in La Cassa on March 30, 1948.

See also
 List of automobile companies founded by the Ceirano brothers
 Aurea (car)

Notes

References 

This article includes some content translated from Spanish Wikipedia

Fiat
Giovanni
1889 births
1956 deaths
Italian automotive pioneers
Italian founders of automobile manufacturers